The 2018 Northeast Conference women's basketball tournament was the concluding event of the 2017–18 season of the Northeast Conference (NEC), held from March 7–11, 2018. Unlike most NCAA Division I basketball conference tournaments, the NEC tournament does not include all of the league's teams. The tournament instead features only the top eight teams from regular-season NEC play. Regular-season co-champion Saint Francis of Pennsylvania won the tournament and with it the NEC's automatic berth in the 2018 NCAA Division I women's basketball tournament.

Format
For the first time, the NEC Women's Basketball Tournament did not use what the conference calls a "complete high-seed hosting" format, in which all games are played at the home of the higher seed. In addition, the tournament did not reseed teams after each round, a format it had used since the 2011 edition. Instead, each half of the bracket was hosted by one of the league's two top seeds. The final continues to be played at the home court of the top remaining seed.

Seeds
The NEC uses the following criteria for breaking two-way ties in the conference standings:
 Head-to-head record.
 Record against the top team not involved in the tie. If more than one team is tied for a given conference placing, the teams' combined records against all teams involved in that tie are compared instead.
 If the tie is not broken, repeat the above step with the next-lowest team not involved in the tie, with the noted caveat in the case of a tie for that placing. Repeat as necessary.
 If the tie is not broken after cycling through the entire conference table, RPI is used.

The procedure for breaking ties in which three or more teams are involved will not be discussed here, since no such ties existed this season.

Bracket

The top two seeds each hosted their half of the bracket; the final was hosted by the top remaining seed.

All-tournament team
Tournament MVP in bold.

References

 
Northeast Conference women's basketball tournament
Northeast Conference women's basketball tournament